Surprise Hour (Spanish: La Hora de las sorpresas) is a 1941 Argentine film.

Cast
 Pedro Quartucci
 Rosita Moreno
 Esteban Serrador
 Marcos Caplán
 Héctor Calcaño
 Héctor Méndez
 Lydia Lamaison
 Juana Sujo

External links
 

1941 films
1940s Spanish-language films
Argentine black-and-white films
1941 musical comedy films
Argentine musical comedy films
1940s Argentine films